Okeene Junior-Senior High school is a public school serving students in grades 7 through 12 in Okeene, Oklahoma. It has currently enrolled under 200 students(counting grade school as well)

History
The first school in Okeene was established in 1901. A high school program was added in the 1920s, making Okeene the first town in Blaine County with a high school.

Extracurricular activities
Student groups and organizations at Okeene include band, FCCLA, Fellowship of Christian Athletes, FFA, National Honor Society, science club, speech, Academic Bowl, student council and Technology Student Association.

Athletics
The Okeene Whippets compete in Class A of Oklahoma Secondary School Activities Association sports, currently fielding teams in baseball, basketball, cheerleading, cross country, football, softball, and track.

State championship titles held by the Whippets include:
Boys' basketball: 2006
Football: 1981 (Class B), 2006, 2007
Girls' track: 2003, 2004, 2005
Boys' track: 2010, 2017

Notable alumni
Jake Lindsay (class of 1937), businessman; namesake of an endowed scholarship and two chairs at Northwestern Oklahoma State University
Donald Dumler (class of 1957), principal organist at St. Patrick's Cathedral, New York

References

External links
http://www.okeene.k12.ok.us/

Public high schools in Oklahoma
Public middle schools in Oklahoma
Schools in Blaine County, Oklahoma